Tuggerah, an electoral district of the Legislative Assembly in the Australian state of New South Wales, was created in 1981 and abolished in 1988.


Election results

Elections in the 1980s

1984

1981

References

New South Wales state electoral results by district